Euscyrtus is a genus of crickets in the subfamily Euscyrtinae.  Species can be found mostly in Africa, Asia and Australia.

Species 
Euscyrtus includes the following species:
subgenus Euscyrtus Guérin-Méneville, 1844
Euscyrtus angustifrons Chopard, 1969
Euscyrtus bipunctatus Chopard, 1958
Euscyrtus bivittatus Guérin-Méneville, 1844 - type species (E. bivittatus bivittatus)
Euscyrtus bolivari Chopard, 1969
Euscyrtus fuscus Ingrisch, 1987
Euscyrtus intermedius Ingrisch, 1987
Euscyrtus laminifer Chopard, 1936
Euscyrtus lineoculus Ingrisch, 1987
Euscyrtus madagascarensis Gorochov, 1988
Euscyrtus major Chopard, 1925
Euscyrtus mexicanus Saussure, 1874
Euscyrtus necydaloides Walker, 1869
Euscyrtus nigrifrons Chopard, 1945
Euscyrtus pallens Karny, 1907
Euscyrtus pallidus Stål, 1877
Euscyrtus planiceps Karsch, 1893
Euscyrtus quadripunctatus Ingrisch, 1987
Euscyrtus sigmoidalis Saussure, 1878
Euscyrtus tubus Meena, Swaminathan & Swaminathan, 2020
subgenus Osus Gorochov, 1987
Euscyrtus concinnus Haan, 1842
Euscyrtus hemelytrus Haan, 1842
Euscyrtus japonicus Shiraki, 1930

References

External links
 
 Image of E. bivittatus on www.galerie-insecte.org

Ensifera genera
crickets
Orthoptera of Asia
Orthoptera of Africa